The mercy seat is an artifact in the Bible, which sat atop the Ark of the Covenant.

Mercy seat may also refer to:

 The Throne of Mercy, also known as Throne of Grace, Christian iconography representing the Trinity
 Mourner's bench, a bench located in front of the chancel in Methodist and other evangelical Christian churches
 A misericord, a small wooden shelf on the underside of a folding seat in a church
 "The Mercy Seat" (song), a 1988 song by Nick Cave and the Bad Seeds
 The Mercy Seat (play), a 2002 play by Neil LaBute
 The Mercy Seat, a late 1980s gospel-punk band formed by Violent Femmes singer/guitarist Gordon Gano
 The Mercy Seat (album), a 2000  album by Don Moen